Juan Ramón Gómez-Pimpollo López (born 18 January 1995), commonly known as Juanra, is a Spanish footballer who plays for UD San Sebastián de los Reyes as a right back.

Club career
Born in La Solana, Ciudad Real, Castilla-La Mancha, Juanra finished his formation with local Albacete Balompié, making his senior debuts with the reserves in the lower leagues. On 11 September 2013 Juanra made his first team debut, starting in a 1–1 away draw against Gimnàstic de Tarragona in the season's Copa del Rey.

Juanra made his league debut on the 29th, playing the full 90 minutes in a 2–1 home success over CP Cacereño in the Segunda División B. He appeared in eight matches during the campaign, as Alba returned to the Segunda División after a three-year absence.

On 1 November 2014 Juanra played his match as a professional, starting in a 1–2 away loss against UD Las Palmas. The following 18 August, he was loaned to Atlético Astorga FC in the third division, for one year.

On 18 August 2016, Juanra left Alba, and signed for Atlético Madrid B two days later. The following 25 July, he joined Real Murcia of the third division.

References

External links

1995 births
Living people
People from Ciudad Real
Sportspeople from the Province of Ciudad Real
Spanish footballers
Footballers from Castilla–La Mancha
Association football defenders
Segunda División players
Segunda División B players
Tercera División players
Atlético Albacete players
Albacete Balompié players
Atlético Astorga FC players
Atlético Madrid B players
Real Murcia players
CF Talavera de la Reina players
UD San Sebastián de los Reyes players